Xerocrassa cisternasi is a species of air-breathing land snail, a pulmonate gastropod mollusk in the family Geomitridae.  

The species joined at least 10 subspecies 

 Xerocrassa cisternasi calasaladae (Jaeckel, 1952)
 Xerocrassa cisternasi calderensis (Gasull, 1964)
 Xerocrassa cisternasi canae (Jaeckel, 1952)
 Xerocrassa cisternasi cisternasi (Hidalgo, 1883)
 Xerocrassa cisternasi conjungens (S. H. F. Jaeckel, 1952)
 Xerocrassa cisternasi hortae (Schröder, 1978)
 Xerocrassa cisternasi margaritae (Jaeckel, 1952)
 Xerocrassa cisternasi mesquidae (Schröder, 1978)
 Xerocrassa cisternasi muradae (Jaeckel, 1952)
 Xerocrassa cisternasi ortizi (Gasull, 1964)
  (Jaeckel, 1952)
 Xerocrassa cisternasi scopulicola (Bofill & Aguilar-Amat, 1924)
 Xerocrassa cisternasi vedrae (S. H. F. Jaeckel, 1952)
 Xerocrassa cisternasi vedranellensis (S. H. F. Jaeckel, 1952)

Distribution

This species is endemic to Spain, where it is restricted to the north-eastern part of the island of Ibiza and the surrounding islets.

References

 Bank, R. A.; Neubert, E. (2017). Checklist of the land and freshwater Gastropoda of Europe. Last update: July 16th, 2017

caroli
Molluscs of Europe
Endemic fauna of the Balearic Islands
Gastropods described in 1883